Oktyabrskoye (Keme-Keçü) is a rural locality (a settlement) in Ust-Koksinsky District, the Altai Republic, Russia. The population was 252 as of 2016. There are 8 streets.

Geography 
Oktyabrskoye is located 10 km southeast of Ust-Koksa (the district's administrative centre) by road. Verkh-Uymon is the nearest rural locality.

References 

Rural localities in Ust-Koksinsky District